Khanpursar is a shallow, non-mictic lake in the Ganderbal district of Jammu and Kashmir in India. It lies 24 km north-west of Srinagar city in the village of Khanpur on the right bank of the Jehlum River. The famous Manasbal Lake lies 6 km in the north.

Khanpursar is fed by springs and a few ephemeral channels and outflows into Jehlum River. The lake is mostly an oval shaped lake with a length of 400 meters and breadth of 300 meters. It has a maximum depth of 4 meters. Willow plantations and paddy cultivations are a part of its catchment area. Khanpursar  is surrounded by a few villages. Khanpur village lies on the eastern side, while as Batpora and Guzhom lie on the southern and north-western sides, respectively. The lake is an important source of fish and the lotus-stem (nadru).

See also
Nigeen Lake
Nundkol Lake
Manasbal Lake
Wular Lake
Gangbal Lake

References

Lakes of Jammu and Kashmir